USS LST-481 was a United States Navy  used in the Asiatic-Pacific Theater during World War II.

Construction
LST-481 was laid down on 4 September 1942, under Maritime Commission (MARCOM) contract, MC hull 1001, by  Kaiser Shipyards, Yard No. 4, Richmond, California; launched on 2 December 1942;  and commissioned on 15 May 1943.

Service history
During the war, LST-481 was assigned to the Pacific Theater of Operations. She took part in the Gilbert Islands operation, November and December 1943; the Occupation of Kwajalein and Majuro Atolls in February 1944; the Battle of Hollandia in April 1944; the Battle of Guam in July 1944; the Battle of Iwo Jima in February 1945; and the Battle of Okinawa in April 1945.

Post-war service
Following the war, LST-481 performed occupation duty in the Far East until mid-November 1945. She returned to the United States and was decommissioned on 28 February 1946, and struck from the Navy list on 12 April 1946. On 16 April 1948, the ship was sold to the Bethlehem Steel Co., Bethlehem, Pennsylvania, and subsequently scrapped.

Awards
LST-481 earned six battle stars for her World War II service.

Notes 

Citations

Bibliography 

Online resources

External links

 

LST-1-class tank landing ships
World War II amphibious warfare vessels of the United States
Ships built in Richmond, California
1942 ships